Kai Eisele (born 25 June 1995) is a German professional footballer who plays as a goalkeeper for  club Karlsruher SC.

References

External links
 

1995 births
Living people
People from Ortenaukreis
Sportspeople from Freiburg (region)
German footballers
Footballers from Baden-Württemberg
Association football goalkeepers
SC Freiburg II players
FC Hansa Rostock players
Hallescher FC players
Fortuna Düsseldorf players
Fortuna Düsseldorf II players
Karlsruher SC players
3. Liga players
Regionalliga players